Lesobeng is a community council located in the Thaba-Tseka District of Lesotho. Its population in 2006 was 12,542.

Villages
The community of Lesobeng includes the villages of

BarengBoinyatsoHa BoleseHa ChejanaHa JanefekeHa KaoHa KhauheloHa KhopisoHa KokoanaHa LebusanaHa LephoiHa LetsikaHa MabilikoeHa MahaoHa MarumoHa MaseruHa Matsila-tsileHa MohauHa MojelaHa MokhafiHa MokoneHa MafikeHa LepolesaHa MotsibaHa MatshosaHa KhetsiHa NyopeHa PohoHa NtjaHa MosiroeHa SeoliHa RahlabiHa NyoloManganengKhatlengKoenengThabanengHa MokotjoRolongHa MakaraHa ThebaneTolingHa PetroseKholokoeMantsanengHa MatsilatsilePhokeng Ha SemousuLikoaringKuenengKhohlongTaung Ha MokhesengHa TsanyaneLetsatseng Ha juliasHa SekoalaHa KokoanaHa khopisoPhororongTaung Ha MoletsaneHa phefoHa KhomariHa LaliHa SehlahlaHa MotsibaHa SephookoHa RalisaleSefateng

Ha MoliaHa MolofotsaneHa Moteba (Tutulung)Ha MothaeHa MotsekiHa NokoaneHa PetroseHa PhaloleHa PhofuHa PutsoaHa QobachaHa RalisaleHa RamajalleHa SephookoHa TebeliHa Thebe-ea-KhaleHa TokotaHa TsanyaneHleoheng
KhauoanengKhoaelengKholokoeKhorongKhorosanengKhubetsoanaKuenengLeribeLetsatsengLikamorengLikoaringLitšoenengMahahengMahooanengMakanyanengMakhalongMakhinaMakoaelengMalalaneng

MalimongMantsanengMatsoetengMonameleng (Ha Sephoko)NtširelePharaPhokengPontšengSehlabeng SekokoanengSekotingSetleketsengTaungThaba-Ntšo ThepungTlhakoanengTopaTsekongTšieng

Education
The Kokoana Primary School officially opened in 2008 with four teachers, 246 pupils and a reception class of about 25 children. Here are the names of schools found in Lesobeng:
Khetsi Primary school (Roman Catholic)Motsiba primary school (Roman Catholic)Koebung Primary School (Roman Catholic)Koebunyane Primary School(Roman Catholic)Qhoboseaneng Primary School(Anglican)Kokoana Primary School(Public)Bofoma Primary School(Evangelical)Semousu Primary School(Public)Montmatre Primary School(Roman Catholic)Lesobeng Secondary School(Roman Catholic)Lesobeng Primary School(Evangelical)Qobacha Primary School(Roman Catholic)Letsika Primary School(Roman Catholic)Mosiroe Primary School(Roman Catholic)Mesoeng Primary School(Evangelical)Mokotjane Secondary School(Public)

References

External links
 Google map of community villages

Populated places in Thaba-Tseka District
Thaba-Tseka District